Jika Jika may refer to places in Victoria, Australia:

 Another name of Billibellary
 A unit of HM Prison Pentridge
 Electoral district of Jika Jika
 Jika Jika Province, an electoral district
 the Shire of Jika Jika, a former name of the City of Preston (Victoria)